Vantile Emmanuel Whitfield (September 8, 1930 – January 9, 2005) was a highly influential arts administrator who helped found several performing arts institutions in the United States.

Background
Vantile Emmanuel Whitfield was born on September 8, 1930, in Washington, D.C., the only child of Theodore Roosevelt Whitfield (1902–1971) and Lugene Ellen Green. While a student at Dunbar High School, he played football and became interested in painting.
  
After high school, he served in the Air Force until 1952.

Whitfield studied theatre at Howard University, receiving a Bachelor of Arts degree in 1957.  After graduation, he enrolled in the master's degree program at the UCLA Film School, becoming one of the first African Americans to study there.

He was married, to actress Lynn Whitfield, from 1974 to 1978.

Career
In 1963, Whitfield co-founded with actor Frank Silvera the American Theatre of Being in Los Angeles. While there he taught acting classes with Beah Richards, Whitman Mayo and Isabel Sanford. Also in 1963, Whitfield designed the sets, lights and costumes for Silvera's production of the James Baldwin play The Amen Corner, becoming the first African-American production designer to work on Broadway.
The following year, Whitfield founded and served as producing artistic director of the Performing Arts Society of Los Angeles (PASLA). The goal of PASLA was to help train inner-city youth in the performing arts. 
  
He was also founding Artistic Director of Studio West and was enlisted by Robert Hooks, of the D.C. Black Repertory Company, to be its Artistic Director.

In 1971, Whitfield was the founding director of the Expansion Arts Program at the National Endowment for the Arts (NEA). In this role, he had perhaps his greatest influence, because this program provided funds for many African-American artists and arts organizations.

Association with L.A. Rebellion filmmakers
Although his tenure at UCLA Film School pre-dates the period generally associated with the L.A. Rebellion, Whitfield had a connection with several filmmakers associated with the film movement. Larry Clark taught film production classes at PASLA while a student at UCLA and directed the short film As Above, So Below (1973) through the organization. Whitfield also acted in Haile Gerima's film Ashes and Embers.

Death
Whitfield died from complications of Alzheimer's disease on January 9, 2005.

Awards and recognition
 1969: NAACP Image Award
 1970: Los Angeles Drama Critics Circle Award
 1992: ETA Creative Arts Foundation Citation
 Jeff Citation for Among All This You Stand Like a Fine Brownstone
 1996: AUDELCO Pioneer Award

References

External links

Vantile E. Whitfield page
Stuart A. Rose Manuscript, Archives, and Rare Book Library, Emory University: Vantile E. Whitfield papers, circa 1953-2005

1930 births
2005 deaths
20th-century American male actors
African-American male actors
Baptists from the United States
Neurological disease deaths in Washington, D.C.
Deaths from Alzheimer's disease
Howard University alumni
Male actors from Washington, D.C.
UCLA Film School alumni
American male television actors
Dunbar High School (Washington, D.C.) alumni
20th-century Baptists
20th-century African-American people
21st-century African-American people